Aleksandr Arkadyevich Shibayev (born 5 September 1961) is a Russian professional football coach and former player.

Club career
He made his professional debut in the Soviet Second League in 1979 for FC Volga Kalinin. He played 2 games in the UEFA Cup 1986–87 for FC Spartak Moscow.

Honours
 Soviet Top League runner-up: 1985.
 Soviet Top League bronze: 1986.
 Russian Premier League champion: 1992.

References

1961 births
Sportspeople from Tver
Living people
Soviet footballers
Russian footballers
Association football defenders
FC Spartak Moscow players
FC Vorskla Poltava players
FC Tyumen players
FC Saturn Ramenskoye players
Soviet Top League players
Russian Premier League players
Russian football managers
FC FShM Torpedo Moscow players
FC Spartak-2 Moscow players